"Bad Time" is a song written by Mark Farner and performed by Grand Funk. It reached number 4 on the Billboard Hot 100 in June 1975 and appeared on the band's 1974 album, All the Girls in the World Beware!!!

Jimmy Ienner produced the song, and it was arranged by Tony Camillo.  It was the group's fourth and final single to reach the Top 10 and their final Top 40 hit in the U.S.

"Bad Time" marked the end of the group's two-year run as Grand Funk, during which time they scored all their major hits. Following this release, their name reverted to Grand Funk Railroad.

Chart performance

Weekly charts

Year-end charts

Other versions 
 The Jayhawks released the track on their 1995 album, Tomorrow the Green Grass.  This version went to number 40 on the UK Singles Chart.

References

External links
 

1974 songs
1975 singles
1995 singles
Grand Funk Railroad songs
Capitol Records singles
Song recordings produced by Jimmy Ienner